Massimo Bruno (born 17 September 1993) is a Belgian footballer who plays as a right winger for Kortrijk.

Club career

Charleroi
Born in Boussu, Belgium, Bruno started his football career at RSB Frameries before he moved to Mons. Bruno joined Anderlecht when he was eight years old. Bruno was progressing well at the club until he suffered "a growth spurt and was injured in the heel" and was sidelined for four months. After making a recovery from his injury, however, Anderlecht released Bruno and he returned to Mons. Bruno then joined Charleroi, where he would begin his professional career. After progressing through the ranks at the club, Bruno was part of the squad for two league matches in November 2010, each time as an unused substitute. On 23 March 2011, he finally made his professional debut – and only appearance of the 2010–11 season – in a 3–0 loss to Cercle Brugge.

Anderlecht
On 23 May 2011, Bruno signed a three-year deal with Anderlecht, where he had previously played in the youth system. However, in his first season at the club, Bruno failed to appear in the first team and was featured in the club's reserves instead.

Ahead of the 2012–13 season, Bruno signed his first professional contract with Anderlecht. On 12 August 2012, he made his debut for the club, coming on as an 85th-minute substitute, in a 3–0 win against Cercle Brugge. On 28 August, coming off the bench, Bruno gave the assist for the winning goal against AEL Limassol, securing Anderlecht's place in the UEFA Champions League group stage. On 2 September 2012, he scored his first professional goal in a 2–2 draw against Genk. On 20 November, he signed a contract extension with Anderlecht, keeping him at the club until 2017. Anderlecht went on to win the Belgian Pro League following a 1–1 against title contender, Zulte Waregem on the last matchday of the season. Bruno finished the season with 44 appearances and scoring 8 goals in all competitions.

In the Belgian Super Cup, Bruno scored the only goal of the game, in a 1–0 win over Genk to help Anderlecht win the cup. He started the 2013–14 season well by scoring five goals in the first month, including a brace against Cercle Brugge. Despite suffering minor setbacks throughout the season, Bruno finished as Anderlecht's joint top-scorer along with Aleksandar Mitrović with 16 goals in all competitions as the club won the Pro League again.

RB Leipzig

Red Bull Salzburg (loan)
In June 2014, Bruno signed for RB Leipzig in the 2. Bundesliga and was immediately loaned to sister club Red Bull Salzburg for the 2014–15 season. He made his debut for Red Bull Salzburg, coming on as a substitute in the 66th minute and setting up the ninth goal of the game for the club, in a 10–1 win over 1. SC Sollenau in the first round of the Austrian Cup. Bruno scored his first goal for the club in the last minute of the 2–0 win against SV Ried on 2 August 2014. In his single season with the club, Bruno helped Salzburg to the domestic double, recording 39 total appearances and scoring eight goals. Following his season with Red Bull Salzburg, it was announced that Bruno would be returning to RB Leipzig.

Return to RB Leipzig
Returning to RB Leipzig, competing in 2. Bundesliga in the 2015–16 season, Bruno made his debut for the club as a 64th-minute substitute in a 1–0 win against FSV Frankfurt in the opening game of the season. On 2 April 2016, he scored his first goals for the club in a 3–1 win against VfL Bochum. On 8 May 2016, Bruno came on as a 79th-minute substitute and helped the club win 2–0 against Karlsruher SC to seal their first-ever promotion to the Bundesliga. At the end of the 2015–16 season, he had made 26 appearances and scored two goals in all competitions.

On 27 August 2016, Bruno made his Bundesliga debut, coming on as an 86th-minute substitute in a 1–1 draw against Hoffenheim in what turned out to be his only appearance in the 2016–17 season.

Return to Anderlecht (loan)
On 31 August 2016, Bruno returned to his former club Anderlecht on loan for the rest of the 2016–17 season. On 11 September 2016, he made his second debut for the club, coming on as a 79th-minute substitute in a 3–2 win against Charleroi. On 3 November 2016, he scored his first goal for the club in two years, in a 6–1 win against 1. FSV Mainz 05 in the UEFA Europa League. On 18 May 2017, he came on as a 77th-minute substitute and scored Anderlecht's third goal of the game to win 3–1 over Charleroi, which helped the club to the Pro League title for the first time in three years. Despite missing one match because of injury, Bruno made 39 appearances and scored six goals in all competitions during his first loan spell at Anderlecht.

On 1 July 2017, Bruno's loan at Anderlecht was extended for the 2017–18 season. Anderlecht finished the season in third place behind Club Brugge and Standard Liège, and Bruno finished the campaign with 23 appearances and two goals in all competitions. After the season, it was confirmed that the club opted not to sign him on a permanent deal.

Return to Charleroi
On 31 August 2018, Bruno re–joined Charleroi, making his return to the club for the first time in seven years. The following day he made his second debut for Charleroi, coming on as a 61st-minute substitute in a 3–1 win over Royal Excel Mouscron. On 10 November 2018, he scored on his return from injury, in a 2–1 win over Club Brugge.

Bursaspor
On 14 August 2021, Bruno signed for TFF First League side Bursaspor. On 23 August, he made his debut, setting up the second goal of the game in a 2–1 loss to BB Erzurumspor. On 15 September, Bruno scored his first goal for Bursaspor in a 4–1 win against Samsunspor.

Kortrijk
On 29 June 2022, Bruno signed a three-year contract with Kortrijk.

Personal life
Bruno is of Italian descent.

Career statistics

Honours

Club
Anderlecht
 Belgian Pro League: 2012–13, 2013–14, 2016–17
 Belgian Super Cup: 2013, 2017

Red Bull Salzburg
Austrian Bundesliga: 2014–15
Austrian Cup: 2014–15

References

External links
 

1993 births
Living people
People from Boussu
Association football wingers
Belgian footballers
Belgium youth international footballers
Belgium under-21 international footballers
Belgian people of Italian descent
R. Charleroi S.C. players
R.S.C. Anderlecht players
FC Red Bull Salzburg players
RB Leipzig players
Bursaspor footballers
K.V. Kortrijk players
Belgian Pro League players
Austrian Football Bundesliga players
Bundesliga players
2. Bundesliga players
TFF First League players
Belgian expatriate footballers
Expatriate footballers in Austria
Expatriate footballers in Germany
Expatriate footballers in Turkey
Belgian expatriate sportspeople in Germany
Belgian expatriate sportspeople in Austria
Belgian expatriate sportspeople in Turkey